Muyezersky is an urban locality (an urban-type settlement) and the administrative center of Muyezersky District of the Republic of Karelia, Russia, located on the Muyezerka River (Kem's basin),  northwest of Petrozavodsk, the capital of the republic. As of the 2010 Census, its population was 3,328.

History

It was founded in the end of the 1930s due to the construction of Rugozersky timber industry enterprise. It was granted urban-type settlement status in 1965.

Administrative and municipal status
Within the framework of administrative divisions, Muyezersky serves as the administrative center of Muyezersky District, of which it is a part. As a municipal division, Muyezersky is incorporated within Muyezersky Municipal District as Muyezerskoye Urban Settlement.

References

Notes

Sources

Urban-type settlements in the Republic of Karelia
Muyezersky District
Monotowns in Russia